Sins of My Father may refer to:

 Sins of My Father (film), a 2009 Argentine documentary film about Pablo Escobar
 "Sins of My Father" (song), a 2012 song by Usher
 "Sins of My Father", a 1995 song by Andy Prieboy from Sins of Our Fathers
 "Sins of My Father", a 2004 song by Tom Waits from Real Gone

See also
 Sins of the Father (disambiguation)